Round 1 may refer to:

 Round 1 (EP), a 2011 EP by C-REAL
 "Round 1" (song), a 2010 song by Dalmatian
 Round 1, an album by Eraser vs Yöjalka
 Round One Entertainment, a Japanese amusement store chain.

See also
 Round One: The Album, an album by Roy Jones, Jr.